Senate elections were held in the Czech Republic on 17 and 18 October 2008, with a second round on 24 and 25 October 2008, electing one-third of the members of the Senate. A total of 200 candidates contested the 27 seats, and more than two-thirds of the incumbents ran for another term – only seven retired.

Governing parties (ODS and KDU-CSL; the Greens had no open seats) suffered massive losses – only 3 candidates (all ODS) were elected. The Opposition Czech Social Democratic Party won the election with 23 out of the 27 seats contested. The Civic Democratic Party lost its majority in the Senate (which was used to delay ratification of the Lisbon Treaty in the Czech Republic).

Results

References

Senate elections in the Czech Republic
Czech Republic
Senate
Senate
Czech